Cù Mông Pass (Đèo Cù Mông) is a mountain pass between Bình Định and Phú Yên provinces in Vietnam. It is on the 1A National Highway. In the 1470s, the pass marked the southern limit of the Lê dynasty extension of Vietnamese rule.

References

Mountain passes of Vietnam
Landforms of Phú Yên province
Landforms of Bình Định province